Oxeye may refer to:

Plants
A number of genera in the family Asteraceae:
Oxeyes (or ox-eyes)
 Heliopsis
 Heteranthemis
 Telekia

Creeping oxeyes
 Sphagneticola, e.g. Bay Biscayne creeping-oxeye (S. trilobata)
 Wedelia

Oxeye daisies
 Buphthalmum
 Leucanthemum vulgare

Marine fish
 Oxeye or Indopacific Tarpon (Megalops cyprinoides)
 Species in the family Oreosomatidae
 Oxeye oreo (Allocyttus folletti)
 Ox-eyed oreo (Oreosoma atlanticum)

Other
Oxeye window